Marko Pavlovski (born 7 February 1994) is a Serbian professional footballer who plays as a midfielder.

Club career
Born in Belgrade, he played with the youth team of OFK Beograd until the season 2010–11 when he made his debut for the main team in the SuperLiga. On 29 August 2013, it was announced that Pavlovski signed for FC Porto on a one-year loan, with the Portuguese side having an option to buy out Pavlovski afterwards. His rights were in fact purchased by Apollon Limassol, who proceeded to loan him out to other clubs.

International career
Marko Pavlovski has been member of the Serbian U19 team since 2011 and was a member of the Serbian squad at the 2012 UEFA European Under-19 Football Championship.

On 25 May 2013, Pavlovski received a call from Čedomir Janevski to represent Macedonia national football team in the friendly matches to be played on 3 and 11 June against Sweden and Norway respectively. He did not respond to this invitation. Months later, Pavlovski captained the Serbia U19 team that won the 2013 UEFA European Under-19 Championship.

Honours

International
Serbia U-19
UEFA European U-19 Championship: 2013
Super Cup - Suduva 2022

Super Cup - FC Porto 2014

Individual
UEFA European Under-19 Championship Team of the Tournament: 2013

Best XI in Alyga 2021

Most valuables XI in Alyga 2022

References

External sources 
 
 Marko Pavlovski at FSS official website
 Marko Pavlovski at OFK Beograd official website

1994 births
Living people
Footballers from Belgrade
Serbian footballers
Serbian expatriate footballers
Serbia youth international footballers
Serbia under-21 international footballers
Association football midfielders
OFK Beograd players
FC Porto B players
Royal Excel Mouscron players
RNK Split players
FK Voždovac players
Varzim S.C. players
FC Dinamo Minsk players
FK Riteriai players
FK Sūduva Marijampolė players
Serbian SuperLiga players
Liga Portugal 2 players
Belgian Pro League players
Croatian Football League players
A Lyga players
Serbian expatriate sportspeople in Portugal
Serbian expatriate sportspeople in Belgium
Serbian expatriate sportspeople in Croatia
Serbian expatriate sportspeople in Belarus
Serbian expatriate sportspeople in Lithuania
Expatriate footballers in Portugal
Expatriate footballers in Belgium
Expatriate footballers in Croatia
Expatriate footballers in Belarus
Expatriate footballers in Lithuania